Sir Aubrey Ernest Ward JP DL (17 April 1899 – 14 June 1987) was a British veterinarian, Liberal Party politician, Mayor of Slough, and Chairman of Buckinghamshire County Council.

Background
He was the son of Edward Alfred Ward. He was educated at the Royal Veterinary College, London. In 1919 he married Mary Jane Davidson Rutherford MB ChB. She died in 1979. They had one daughter. He was knighted in 1967.

Professional career
He served in the War of 1914–18 as a Night Flying Officer in the Royal Flying Corps. In 1923 he opened a Veterinary practice which he went on to run until retiring in 1966.

Political career
He entered local government politics being elected to the Municipal Borough of Slough representing Upton Ward. In 1940 he was elected by the council to serve as Mayor of Slough. In 1941 he was elected by the council to sit as an Alderman. He continued to serve as the borough's Mayor until 1945. 
He was the unsuccessful Liberal candidate for the Eton and Slough division of Buckinghamshire at the 1945 General Election. He did not stand for parliament again.

Election result

In 1957 he became a Justice of the peace. In 1961 he became an Honorary Freeman of the Borough of Slough. In 1963 he was appointed a Deputy Lieutenant for Buckinghamshire. In 1963 he became Chairman of Buckinghamshire County Council, serving in that role for the next eleven years. In 1964 he was appointed Vice-Chairman of the Thames Conservancy Board, serving in that role for ten years.

See also
List of mayors of Slough
Eton and Slough (UK Parliament constituency)

References

1899 births
1987 deaths
Knights Bachelor
Liberal Party (UK) parliamentary candidates
Alumni of the Royal Veterinary College
Place of birth missing
English justices of the peace
English veterinarians
Royal Flying Corps officers
Members of Buckinghamshire County Council